Haela Ravenna Hunt-Hendrix (formerly Hunter Hunt-Hendrix; born January 25, 1985) is an American musician and composer. She is best known for her work as creator, lead singer, and guitarist of black metal band Liturgy.

Personal life
Hunt-Hendrix was born in 1985 in New York City, the child of academician Helen LaKelly Hunt and self-help author Harville Hendrix. She is a member of the wealthy Hunt family, brought to prominence by her grandfather, oil tycoon H. L. Hunt. Hunt-Hendrix grew up in New Mexico, New Jersey, and Brooklyn, New York.

In May 2020, Hunt-Hendrix came out as transgender in an Instagram post, writing, "The love I have to give is a woman's love, if only because it is mine. To varying degrees many already understand this, but I'd like to make a clear statement about my actual gender."

Career
Hunt-Hendrix formed Liturgy as a solo project while attending Columbia University in New York City. In 2008, Hunt-Hendrix released the EP Immortal Life under the Liturgy name, and the band cohered as a quartet with Bernard Gann (guitar), Greg Fox (drums), and Tyler Dusenbury (bass). Liturgy released their first full-length record, Renihilation, in 2009. Liturgy's second and third albums, Aesthethica (2011) and The Ark Work (2015), were released with Thrill Jockey Records. Despite the critical success of Aesthetica, Hunt-Hendrix stated in an interview with Pitchfork that "I was never happy with any other Liturgy release. I didn’t want to release them. But the aim with this one (The Ark Work) was to take that musical vibe and execute it all the way—and I love it."

In November 2019, Liturgy debuted their fourth studio album, H.A.Q.Q. The album features a new lineup, with original members Hunt-Hendrix and Gann joined by Tia Vincent-Clark (bass) and Leo Didkovsky (drums). 

On November 20, 2020, Liturgy released their fifth full-length studio album, the "cosmogonical opera-album" Origin of the Alimonies; with the release came the announcement of an accompanying operatic film written, shot, edited by, and starring Hunt-Hendrix. Hunt-Hendrix debuted an earlier version of the video opera at National Sawdust in October 2018. 

In 2005, Hunt-Hendrix’s screamo side project The Birthday Boyz released their debut album The Bro Cycle. Following this, Hunt-Hendrix collaborated with Krallice guitarist Collin Marston and former Birthday Boyz bandmates Greg Smith and Jeff Bobula to form the band Survival, who released their eponymous debut in 2013.

In 2016 Hunt-Hendrix released an electronic album titled New Introductory Lectures on the System of Transcendental Qabala under the band name Kel Valhaal. Hunt-Hendrix describes the release as combining elements of classical music, electronic music, rap, and metal, as well as working "to activate transcendental catharsis using the elements of sound design."

In September 2019, Hunt-Hendrix released the single "Seraphim" with the "trap-djent" band Ideal.

References

External links
Hunter Hunt-Hendrix YouTube Channel

21st-century women musicians
21st-century American women guitarists
Musicians from New York City
Living people
American experimental guitarists
Columbia University alumni
Transgender women musicians
American women composers
Women opera composers
American heavy metal guitarists
American women heavy metal singers
American opera composers
1985 births
American LGBT musicians
Black metal musicians
Hunt family
Transgender singers
American LGBT singers
LGBT people from New York (state)